USS Kingfisher (MHC-56) was the sixth ship of Osprey-class coastal mine hunters. She is named after the kingfisher.

Kingfisher was decommissioned in a joint ceremony along with three other Coastal Mine Hunters. She was the last Coastal Mine Hunter (MHC) in active service with the US Navy. She was transferred to a Naval Inactive Ships Storage Facility in Texas to await transfer under Foreign Military Sales. This sale never happened. Stricken from the Navy list 01 December 2007, sold by U.S. General Services Administration for scrap, 08 May 2014.

References 

 http://www.bharat-rakshak.com/NEWS/newsrf.php?newsid=13487

 

Ships built in Mississippi
1994 ships
Osprey-class coastal minehunters